Olen is a rural locality (a village) in Kireyevsky District of Tula Oblast, Russia, located  above sea level.

References

Rural localities in Tula Oblast